Milton Hospital is a hospital located in Milton, Massachusetts, at 199 Reedsdale Road.

History 
Founded in 1903, Milton Hospital began operations as a convalescent home. 1903 saw the Cunningham Foundation offering a portion of the Edward Cunningham Estate for future development and expansion of the services offered at that time. Milton Hospital was officially incorporated in 1903 with just nine beds.

In 1944, the current site of Milton Hospital was finalized with a purchase of lands from the Pierce Estate. The newly constructed hospital building finally opening its doors in 1950. In 1987, a new patient service wing and main entrance were added. Renovations provided space for several departments, namely; emergency department, ambulatory care unit, diagnostic services department, intensive care/coronary care unit, operating suites and a conference area.

Affiliations
Now an affiliate of Beth Israel Deaconess Medical Center (BIDMC), Milton Hospital has produced the following specialized programs:
Rapid Cardiac Transfer
Geriatrics
Emergency Care
Cardiovascular Health
Prostate Health

References

Hospital buildings completed in 1950
Hospitals in Norfolk County, Massachusetts